Jesus of Lübeck was a carrack built in the Free City of Lübeck in the early 16th century.

English fleet
Around 1540 the ship, which had mostly been used for representative purposes, was acquired by Henry VIII, King of England, to augment his fleet. 

The ship saw action during the French invasion of the Isle of Wight in 1545. She, along with Samson, was used in an unsuccessful attempt to raise  Henry VIII’s flagship, Mary Rose, after she foundered during the Battle of the Solent.

Slaving vessel
In 1563, Jesus of Lübeck was chartered to a group of merchants by Queen Elizabeth I, becoming involved in the Atlantic slave trade and smuggling under John Hawkins, who organized four slave voyages to West Africa and the West Indies between 1562 and 1568. 

During the last voyage, Jesus, along with several other English ships, encountered a Spanish fleet off San Juan de Ulúa (modern day Vera Cruz, Mexico) in September 1568. In the resulting battle, Jesus was disabled and captured by Spanish forces. The heavily damaged ship was later sold for 601 ducats to a local merchant.

Bibliography

External links

16th-century ships
Slave ships
Ships built in Lübeck
Ships of the English navy